Sex assignment (sometimes known as gender assignment) is the discernment of an infant's sex at or before  birth. A relative, midwife, nurse or physician inspects the external genitalia when the baby is delivered and, in more than 99.95% of births, sex is assigned without ambiguity. Assignment may also be done prior to birth through prenatal sex discernment.

The sex assignment at or before birth usually aligns with a child's anatomical sex and phenotype. The number of births where the baby is intersex—where they do not fit into typical definitions of male and female at birth—has been reported to be as low as 0.018%, but is often estimated at around 0.2%. The number of births with ambiguous genitals is in the range of 0.02% to 0.05%. These conditions may complicate sex assignment. Other intersex conditions involve atypical chromosomes, gonads or hormones. Reinforcing sex assignments through surgical or hormonal interventions is often considered to violate the individual's human rights.

Traditionally assignment carries the implicit expectation that future gender identity will develop in alignment with the physical anatomy, assignment, and rearing. In about 99.4% of cases, the child's gender identity will match their sex assignment. If sex assignment and gender identity do not align, the person is transgender. The sex assignment of an intersex individual may also contradict their future gender identity.

Terminology

Sex assignment is the discernment of an infant's sex at birth. Terms that may be related to sex assignment are:

Assigned male at birth (AMAB): a person of any age and irrespective of current gender whose sex assignment at birth resulted in a declaration of "male". Synonyms: male assigned at birth (MAAB) and designated male at birth (DMAB).

Assigned female at birth (AFAB): a person of any age and irrespective of current gender whose sex assignment at birth resulted in a declaration of "female". Synonyms: female assigned at birth (FAAB) and designated female at birth (DFAB).

Intersex, in humans and other animals, describes variations in sex characteristics  including chromosomes, gonads, sex hormones, or genitals that, according to the UN Office of the High Commissioner for Human Rights, "do not fit typical binary notions of male or female bodies". These may complicate the sex assignment of a newborn and can result a phenotypical sex assignment that is inconsistent with normal genotype.

Transgender people have a gender identity, or gender expression, that differs from their assigned sex. Transgender people are sometimes called transsexual if they desire medical assistance to transition from one sex to another.

Sex reassignment: a treatment program consisting of a combination of psychological, medical, and surgical methods intended to physically change a person's sexual characteristics.

Assignment in cases of infants with intersex traits, or cases of trauma

Observation or recognition of an infant's sex may be complicated in the case of intersex infants and children and in cases of early trauma. In such cases, the infant may be assigned male or female, and may receive medical treatment to confirm that assignment. These medical interventions have increasingly been seen as a human rights issue due to their unnecessary nature and the potential for lifelong complications.

Cases of trauma include the famous John/Joan case, where sexologist John Money claimed successful reassignment from male to female at age 17 months of a boy whose penis was destroyed during circumcision. However, this claim was later shown to be largely false. The subject, David Reimer, later identified as a man.

The number of births with ambiguous genitals is in the range of 1 in 2,000 to 1 in 4,500 (0.05% to 0.02%). Typical examples would be an unusually prominent clitoris in an otherwise apparently typical girl, or complete cryptorchidism in an otherwise apparently typical boy. In most of these cases, a sex is tentatively assigned and the parents told that tests will be performed to confirm the apparent sex. Typical tests in this situation might include a pelvic ultrasound to determine the presence of a uterus, a testosterone or 17α-hydroxyprogesterone level, and/or a karyotype. In some of these cases a pediatric endocrinologist is consulted to confirm the tentative sex assignment. The expected assignment is usually confirmed within hours to a few days in these cases.

Some infants are born with enough ambiguity that assignment becomes a more drawn-out process of multiple tests and intensive education of the parents about sexual differentiation. In some of these cases, it is clear that the child will face physical difficulties or social stigma as they grow up, and deciding upon the sex of assignment involves weighing the advantages and disadvantages of either assignment. Intersex activists have criticised "normalising" procedures performed on infants and children, who are unable to provide informed consent.

History 
In European societies, Roman law, post-classical canon law, and later common law, referred to a person's sex as male, female or hermaphrodite, with legal rights as male or female depending on the characteristics that appeared most dominant. Under Roman law, a hermaphrodite had to be classed as either male or female. The 12th-century Decretum Gratiani states that "Whether a hermaphrodite may witness a testament, depends on which sex prevails". The foundation of common law, the 16th Century Institutes of the Lawes of England, described how a hermaphrodite could inherit "either as male or female, according to that kind of sexe which doth prevaile." Legal cases where sex assignment was placed in doubt have been described over the centuries.

With the medicalization of intersex, criteria for assignment have evolved over the decades, as clinical understanding of biological factors and diagnostic tests have improved, as surgical techniques have changed and potential complications have become clearer, and in response to the outcomes and opinions of adults who have grown up with various intersex conditions.

Before the 1950s, assignment was based almost entirely on the appearance of the external genitalia. Although physicians recognized that there were conditions in which the apparent secondary sexual characteristics could develop contrary to the person's sex, and conditions in which the gonadal sex did not match that of the external genitalia, their ability to understand and diagnose such conditions in infancy was too poor to attempt to predict future development in most cases.

In the 1950s, endocrinologists developed a basic understanding of the major intersex conditions such as congenital adrenal hyperplasia (CAH), androgen insensitivity syndrome, and mixed gonadal dysgenesis. The discovery of cortisone allowed survival of infants with severe CAH for the first time. New hormone tests and karyotypes allowed more confident diagnosis in infancy and prediction of future development.

Sex assignment became more than choosing a sex of rearing, but also began to include surgical treatment.  Undescended testes could be retrieved. A greatly enlarged clitoris could be amputated to the usual size, but attempts to create a penis were unsuccessful. John Money and others controversially believed that children were more likely to develop a gender identity that matched sex of rearing than might be determined by chromosomes, gonads, or hormones. The resulting medical model was termed the "Optimal gender model".

Challenges to requirements for sex assignment
In recent years, the perceived need to legally assign sex is increasingly being challenged by transgender, transsexual, and intersex people. A report for the Dutch Ministry of Security and Justice states "Gender increasingly seems to be perceived as a 'sensitive' identity feature, but so far is not regarded, nor protected as such in privacy regulations". Australian government guidelines state that "departments and agencies that collect sex and/or gender information must not collect information unless it is necessary for, or directly related to, one or more of the agency's functions or activities"

Sex registration was introduced in the Netherlands in 1811 due to gender-specific rights and responsibilities, such as military conscription. Many gender-specific provisions in legislation no longer exist, but the provisions remain for rationales that include "speed of identification procedures".

References

Genital modification and mutilation
Human sexuality
Intersex and medicine
Sex-determination systems
Transgender and medicine